Klein is the Dutch, German and Afrikaans word for "small", which came to be used as a surname, and thence passed into the names of places, concepts and discoveries associated with bearers of this surname. 

It is also a common Jewish surname in the United States, Europe and Brazil.

Politics and government
 Aaron Klein (born 1979), senior adviser, chief strategist for Prime Minister Benjamin Netanyahu
 Arthur George Klein (1904–1968), United States Representative from New York
 Clayton Klein (born 1949), American politician in Oregon
 Ezra Klein (born 1984), American political writer
 Herb Klein (journalist) (1918–2009), American journalist, President Nixon's communications director
 Herb Klein (politician) (born 1930), American politician
 Herbert G. Klein (1918–2009), American political aide
 Jacob Theodor Klein ("Plinius Gedanensium") (1685–1759), Prussian jurist, historian, botanist, mathematician and diplomat
 Jacques Paul Klein (born 1939), French-born United States diplomat
 Joe Klein (born 1946), American writer for Time magazine
 Karsten Klein (born 1977), German politician
 Louis Klein (1759–1845), French politician and peer, General during the French Revolutionary and Napoleonic Wars 
 Louis Christian Klein (1832–1900), German American politician in Wisconsin
 Norbert Klein (born 1956), Dutch politician
 Ottilie Klein (born 1984), German politician
 Ralph Klein (1942–2013), Canadian politician
 Ron Klein (born 1957), American (Florida) politician
 Volkmar Klein (born 1960), German politician

Entertainment and music
 Klein (musician), recording artist, producer and singer from South London
 Alan Klein (born 1940), English singer and songwriter (New Vaudeville Band)
 Allen Klein (1931–2009), manager for the Beatles and Rolling Stones
 Barbara Lynn Klein (born 1950), American Playboy model, actress and singer known as Barbi Benton
 Carol Joan Klein (born 1942), American composer and singer-songwriter better known by her stage name Carol King
 Chris Klein (born 1979), American actor
 Dani Klein (born 1953), stage name of Danielle Schoovaerts (born 1953), Belgian singer and songwriter
 Elisabeth Klein (1911–2004), Hungarian-Danish pianist
 Ethan Klein (born 1985), American Youtuber
 Gary Klein (born 1942), songwriter, record producer, and co-writer of "(I Wanna Be) Bobby's Girl"
 Gene Klein (born 1949), American musician and member of Kiss, better known as "Gene Simmons"
 Gideon Klein (1919–1945), pianist and composer
 Jesper Klein (1944–2011), Danish actor
 Jim Klein, American composer and songwriter
 Joey Klein, Canadian actor and film director
 Mannie Klein (1908–1994), American jazz trumpeter
 Marci Klein (born 1967), American Emmy-winning television producer
 Mark Klein (born 1993), American singer-songwriter
 Oscar Klein (1930–2006), Austrian-born jazz trumpeter 
 Robert Klein (born 1942), American stand-up comedian and actor
 Susan Klein, inventor of the Klein Technique, a movement/dance technique studied by Garry Stewart

Literature
 A. M. Klein (Abraham Moses Klein, 1909–1972), Canadian poet
 Aaron J. Klein (1960–2016), Israeli author and journalist
 Augusta Klein (1866–1943), English author
 Bradley S. Klein (born 1954), American author, architecture editor for Golf Week magazine
 Charles Klein (1867–1915) London-born American playwright
 Chuck Klein (born 1947) American author
 Daniel Martin Klein (born 1939), American author
 Ernest Klein (1899 – February 4, 1983), Canadian linguist, author, and rabbi
 Gérard Klein (born 1937), French science fiction writer
 Hannelore Klein (born 1927), German-born American linguist and write known as Laureen Nussbaum
 Joe Klein (born 1946), American journalist and novelist (Primary Colors)
 Josef K. Klein (1896–1971), Bulgarian poet of Austrian origin known by the pseudonym Gustav Heinse
 Julius Leopold Klein (1810–1876), Hungarian dramatist
 Marlon Klein (born 1957), German world music and fusion musician and producer
 Naomi Klein (born 1970), Canadian author and activist
 Nathan Klein (1923–2004), Ukrainian-born Israeli poet known as Natan Yonatan
 Robin Klein (born 1936), Australian author of children's books
 T. E. D. Klein (born 1947), American horror writer and editor

Academics and technology
 Aaron E. Klein (1930–1998), American historian of science
 Abel Klein (born 1945), American mathematician
 Dan Klein, American computer scientist
 Daniel Klein (grammarian) (Lithuanian: Danielius Kleinas; 1609–1666), German-Lithuanian pastor and grammarian
 Daniel B. Klein (born 1962), American economist
 Emanuel Edward Klein (1844–1925), British bacteriologist 
 Esther Klein (married name Esther Szekeres; 1910–2005), Hungarian–Australian mathematician
 Etienne Klein (born 1958), French physicist and philosopher of science
 Felix Klein (1849–1925), German mathematician
 Fritz Klein (1888–1945), German Nazi physician and war criminal
 Fritz Klein (sex researcher) (1932–2006), American sex researcher
 Gary A. Klein (born 1944), American research psychologist
 George Klein (inventor) (1904–1992), Canadian inventor
 Heinz Klein (1940–2008), American sociologist
 Jacob Theodor Klein (1685–1759), Prussian botanist
 Jan Klein (born 1936), Czech-American immunologist
 Lawrence Klein (1920–2013), American economist
 Luella Klein (–2019), American obstetrician-gynecologist and professor
 Martin J. Klein (1924–2009), American science historian of physics
 Marty Klein (born 1950), American sex therapist
 Melanie Klein (1882–1960), British psychotherapist
 Oskar Klein (1894–1977), Swedish physicist
 Richard Klein (paleoanthropologist) (born 1941), American paleoanthropologist
 Sabra Klein, American microbiologist
 Wilhelm Klein (1850–1924), Hungarian-Austrian archeologist
 Willem Klein (1912–1986), Dutch mathematician and famous mental calculator

Art
 Aart Klein (1909–2001), Dutch photographer
 Anna Klein (painter) (1883–1941), German landscape, animal and genre painter
 Franz Klein (1779–1840), Viennese sculptor, who created a famous bust of Beethoven
 Fred Klein (1898–1990), Dutch painter active in France; father of Yves Klein
 Mary-Austin Klein (born 1964), American artist
 Roman Klein (1858–1924), Russian architect
 Todd Klein (born 1951), comic book letterer
 Vilhelm Klein (1835–1913). Danish architect
 William Klein (born 1928), American-born French photographer and filmmaker
 Yves Klein (1928–1962), French painter, son of Fred Klein

Religion
 Ernest Klein (1899–1983), Canadian linguist and rabbi
 Félix Klein (1862–1953), French priest and theologian
 Isaac Klein (1905–1979), American rabbi
 Menashe Klein (1924–2011), American rabbi
 Norbert Klein (1866–1933), Grand Master of the Teutonic Knights

Business and industry
 Anne Klein (1923–1974), American fashion designer
 Bill Klein (businessman) (born c. 1948), American businessman and poker player
 Calvin Klein (fashion designer) (born 1942), American fashion designer
 David Klein (1946), Invented Jelly Belly Jelly Beans.￼
 David Klein (1935–2021), governor, Bank of Israel
 Fernando Heydrich Klein (1827–1903) German businessman, politician, engineer and sculptor
 Jonathan Klein (CNN), president of the American television news network CNN
 Jonathan Klein (Getty Images) (born 1960), founder of Getty Images
 Leonardo Farkas Klein (born 1967), Chilean businessman
 Mathias Klein, founder of Klein Tools
 Robin Klein (venture capitalist) (born 1947), British entrepreneur and investor

Sports
 Abraham Klein (referee) (born 1934), Israeli football referee
 Ágnes Keleti (born 1920), born Klein, Hungarian-Israeli Olympic champion artistic gymnast
 Brydan Klein (born 1989), Australian-born British tennis player
 Chris Klein (soccer) (born 1976), American soccer player
 Chuck Klein (1904–1958), American baseball player
 Collin Klein (born 1989), American football player
 Dede Klein (1910–1966), Canadian ice hockey player
 Dieter Klein (born 1988), South African cricketer
 Ernest Klein (1910–1990), Austrian-British chess master and author
 Erwin Klein (d. 1992), American table tennis player
 Frederick C Klein (born 1938), American sportswriter
 Hanna Klein, German athlete
 Herbert Klein (swimmer) (1923–2001), German swimmer
 Jackie Klein (born 1937), American artistic gymnast
 Joe Klein (baseball executive) (1942–2017), American baseball executive
 Kevin Klein (born 1984), Canadian ice hockey player
 Kristin Klein (born 1970), American volleyball player (1959–1993)
 Ľudovít Klein (born 1995), Slovak mixed martial artist
 Martin Klein (footballer), Czech international footballer
 Martin Klein (wrestler) (1884–1947), Estonian wrestler
 Michael Klein (footballer) (1959–1993), Romanian international footballer
 Noeki Klein (born 1983), Dutch water polo player
 Perry Klein (born 1971), American football quarterback in the National Football League who played for the Atlanta Falcons
 Ralph Klein (basketball) (1931–2008), Israeli basketball player and coach
 Roelof Klein (1877–1960), Dutch rower
 Siegmund Klein (1902–1987), American bodybuilder

Other
 Aaron Klein (born 1978), American radio talk show host and conspiracy theorist
 Carol Klein (born 1945), British gardening broadcaster and writer
 Fritz Klein (1888–1945), German Nazi doctor hanged for war crimes 
 Gerda Weissmann Klein (born 1924), Holocaust survivor
 Hans Klein (1891–1944), German Luftwaffe Major-General
 Johannes Klein (died 1926), German First World War flying ace
 Mark Klein (fl. 2006), American whistleblower and former AT&T technician
 Suzy Klein (born 1975), British music and arts broadcaster

Variant surnames
 Klajn
 Kleijn
 Kleine

See also
 Cline (surname)
 Clyne (surname)
 Klein (disambiguation)
 Kleinová (surname)
 Kline (surname)
  Kleinfeld (surname)
 Little, a surname
 Petit (disambiguation)

German-language surnames
Dutch-language surnames
Jewish surnames
Yiddish-language surnames
Surnames from nicknames